The Disaster Resource Network (DRN), an initiative of the World Economic Forum, was the first non-governmental organization to donate to the United Nations' CERF. The UN CERF is a fund created to aid regions threatened by starvation and disasters, particularly African nations.  DRN organizes and mobilizes business sector resources to provide assistance in response to disasters around the world.

External links
 DRN page
 CERF Page

Hunger relief organizations
Emergency organizations